Bakura is a Local Government Area in Zamfara State, Nigeria. Its headquarters are in the town of Bakura at in the north-east of the Local government area.

It has an area of 1,366 km and a population of 186,905 at the 2006 census.

The postal code of the area is 892.

References

Local Government Areas in Zamfara State